Challwa Mayu (Quechua for "fish river") may refer to:

Rivers
 Challwamayu (Huancavelica), a river in the Huancavelica Region in Peru
 Challwamayu (Junín), a river in the Junín Region in Peru

Place 
 Challwa Mayu, Bolivia, a place in Bolivia